Gelinkaya is a village in the Midyat District of Mardin Province in Turkey. The village is populated by Kurds and Mhallami and had a population of 1,623 in 2021.

Etymology 
The word 'Keferhuvar' means 'village with white stones' in Syriac.

History 
Gelinkaya is a former Assyrian village. It became the administrative center for the Mhallami in the 1850s when a beg from nearby Dêrizbin settled in the village, after a conflict with his relatives. After the 1920s, Kurds from nearby villages such as Deywan and Helex but also from the Sinjar region arrived to the village.

Notable people 

 Orhan Miroğlu

References 

Villages in Midyat District
Kurdish settlements in Mardin Province
Historic Assyrian communities in Turkey
Mhallami villages